The Regional Council of Bourgogne-Franche-Comté is the deliberative assembly of the region of Bourgogne-Franche-Comté. Marie-Guite Dufay of the Socialist Party (PS) is the current president of the regional council, elected on 4 January 2016, following the regional elections on 6 and 13 December 2015.

History 
The regional council of Bourgogne-Franche-Comté was created by the act on the delimitation of regions, regional and departmental elections and amending the electoral calendar of 16 January 2015, which went into effect on 1 January 2016 and merged the regional councils of Burgundy and Franche-Comté, consisting of 57 and 43 regional councillors, respectively, into a single body with 100 regional councillors, following regional elections on 6 and 13 December 2015.

Seat 
On 24 June 2016, the members of the Bourgogne-Franche-Comté regional council voted in favor of a proposal by Marie-Guite Dufay, president of the regional council, to designate Dijon as the prefecture of the newly unified region and agreed to select the Hôtel de Région at 4 square Castan in Besançon as the seat of the regional council. The previous seat of the regional council of Burgundy, located at 17 boulevard de la Trémouille in Dijon, became the meeting place of assemblies of the regional council. The plan was approved with 79 votes in favor, 18 votes against, and 3 abstentions.

Election results

2015 regional election 
The current regional council was elected in regional elections on 6 and 13 December 2015, with the list of Marie-Guite Dufay consisting of the Socialist Party (PS), the Radical Party of the Left (PRG), and Cap21 securing an absolute majority of 51 seats.

Composition

Political groups 
The regional council currently consists of four political groups.

Executive

Presidents 
On 4 January 2016, Marie-Guite Dufay of the Socialist Party (PS), who presided over the regional council of Franche-Comté before its merger, was elected president of the regional council. Despite the fact the left held a majority, Dufay was not elected in the first round of the ballot, securing only 49 votes against Sophie Montel with 24 votes and 27 blank votes (the right having decided not to present a candidate), because two members of the Radical Party of the Left (PRG) withheld their support for Dufay in the first round in order to secure vice presidencies. She was subsequently elected with 51 votes in a second ballot.

Vice presidents 
In addition to the president, the executive of the regional council also includes 15 vice presidents, as well as regional councillors serving as advisers on certain policy areas.

Committees 
The regional council includes 5 thematic committees responsible for examining files on policy areas and submitting their deliberations to the vote of the 33-member standing committee or a plenary session.

References

External links 
Official website of the Bourgogne-Franche-Comté region 

Organizations based in Bourgogne-Franche-Comté
Bourgogne-Franche-Comté